Zhokhoi Chüzho is an Indian actor from Nagaland. He is well known in Nagaland for starring in the 2017 film Nana: A Tale of Us which was a critical and commercial success in the state. His other role includes Little boy (2019), Enter My World (2020) and Nani Teri Morni (2020).

Chüzho is serving as the President of Rising Youth under the Rising People's Party (RPP) since April 2022.

Life and career
Zhokhoi Chüzho was born in 1984 in Dimapur, Nagaland to a Chakhesang Naga family. He started his acting career with Nagamese, and has also worked in Doordarshan. After going through multiple auditions Chüzho got a chance in Bollywood.

Selected filmography

References

External links
 
 @zhokhoi_chuzho on Instagram

Living people
Indian male film actors
Naga people
1984 births
People from Dimapur